Khajaguda Lake is a lake in Ranga Reddy District in the Indian state of Telangana and on the western edge of the city of Hyderabad, in the suburb of Manikonda, in the middle of Makthakousarali, Khajaguda area. It is near to Embassy SAS iTower, a very high-rise commercial complex, situated on Khajaguda - Nanakramguda Road.

History 
Khajaguda Lake was built in 1897 during the reign of 6th Nizam Nawab Mahboob Ali Khan . This lake supplied water to 900 acres of Ayakattu in Kamareddy , Sarampally and Narsampally areas.

Maintenance 
The GHAC (Great Hyderabad Adventure Club) has been carrying out clean sweep days on the lake shore in 2013 and 2014.

Tourism 

With the Khajaguda Hills (Fakhruddin Gutta) to the South of the lake, the site is a popular spot for outdoor activities, such as hiking and bouldering.  Fakhruddin Gutta granite rock formations (popularly known as Khajaguda Hills) are as old as 2.5 billion years. Khajaguda Rock Formation, which is prehistoric heritage site, is spread across . The tomb of Saint Hazrat Baba Fakhruddin Aulia — spiritual mentor of Ala-ud-Din Bahman Shah (founder of the Bahmani Kingdom) who was buried here in 1353 AD; an over 800-year-old Annatha Padmanabha Swamy Temple and a cave where the revered saint, Meher Baba had meditated are situated on Khajaguda Hills (Fakhruddin Gutta).

In the beginning of 2019, some illegal quarrying was carried out, and parts of the boulders have been destroyed, even though the High Court directed the Greater Hyderabad Municipal Corporation and Hyderabad Metropolitan Development Authority to ensure that the boulders were not damaged.

Outer Ring Road -Lanco Hills link road is under construction as part of Corridor 39B. This 3.89 km long link road is constructed along side the Khajaguda Heritage Rock Formation.

See also
 Manikonda
 Society to Save Rocks
 Manikonda Cheruvu (Yellamma Cheruvu)

References

External links

Lakes of Hyderabad, India